The Nineveh Plains offensive was a battle in which the Islamic State of Iraq and the Levant (ISIL) mounted a multi–front attack against Peshmerga forces in the area north and east of Mosul, in December 2015.  The attack—the most significant ISIL military operation in the area in months, was successfully repelled by the Kurdish forces and was followed by a coalition air counter-offensive.

Background 
Over the past year, Kurdish forces had been slowly retaking positions around Mosul under ISIL control as part of the Mosul offensive (2015), notably retaking Sinjar in November. These positions threatened ISIL's control over Mosul. Disagreements between Kurds and Iraqi forces slowed the process of expelling ISIL. The Kurds appealed to the West for more military support. It was noted that U.S. Defense Secretary Ashton B. Carter was visiting the nearby city of Erbil to meet a Kurdish official on the day of the attack.

Offensive 
On December 16 and 17, ISIL launched a multi–front attack against the Kurdish defensive lines lasting 17 hours and involving at least 300 heavily armed ISIL fighters. The offensive involved at least four coordinated attacks, in the Newaran, Bashik, Tl Eswed, Khazir and Zerdk Mountain areas, as well as the Peshmerga bunkers in the village of Shindokha.  The attack involved an element of surprise, and the ISIL fighters were able to briefly breach the lines before being repelled.  The attack was described as "the hardest punch ISIL had thrown since this summer" by a USA military official.

The military Zilikahn base, where 100–200 Turkish troops have been training local Kurd fighters, was also attacked by mortar fire and Katyusha rockets. A spokesman for the Patriotic Union of Kurdistan said that the ISIL fighters were trying to target Peshmerga forces and attacked the Zilikan base by mistake.

Canadian special forces, numbering 69, were also in the area to train Kurdish forces and were involved in the battle, laying down supporting fire to back up the Kurds as they undertook a counter-offensive Thursday.  Canadian forces have also in the past acted as spotters for coalition planes.

Brig. Gen Mark Odom, the senior American officer in the area, indicated that ISIL's principal objective may have been a "spoiling attack", meant to disrupt efforts to encircle and capture Mosul. Iraq Kurdish president Masoud Barzani noted that the attack occurred on Kurdish Flag Day and speculated that it had been under preparation for a month.

Tactics 
ISIL fighters used mortars, rockets and several vehicular suicide bombers. In one area—Nawaran—extremists set off nine car bombs, according to local reports.  Trucks with mounted machine guns were also used in support, as well as armored bulldozers, to fill defensive trenches protecting the Kurdish positions. The attackers also took advantage of the bad weather to provide cover.

The possible use of a drone by ISIL, possibly to direct mortar fire, was noted by Atheel al-Nujaifi, the former governor of Iraq's Nineveh province. Initially assumed to belong to the coalition, contacts revealed that it was not theirs.

Air counterattack 
American, British, French, and Canadian planes were involved in a series of airstrikes against the ISIL forces to assist the Kurds in repelling the attack. ISIL positions were also bombed. Some Kurdish commanders noted that while they were grateful for the Western air support, that they felt that the planes were somewhat late.

Casualties 
Estimates of ISIL casualties were of 70 killed by the Kurdish defenders, and "at least 180" killed by airstrikes. Four Turkish soldiers were also injured. Kurdish losses amounted to at least 6 dead.

See also 

 Combined Joint Task Force – Operation Inherent Resolve
 Iraqi Civil War (2014–2017)
 Islamic State of Iraq and the Levant

References 

Conflicts in 2015
Military operations of the Iraqi Civil War in 2015
Military operations of the War in Iraq (2013–2017) involving the Islamic State of Iraq and the Levant
Military operations of the War in Iraq (2013–2017) involving the Peshmerga
Military operations of the War in Iraq (2013–2017) involving Canada